Pacôme is a French masculine given name, and sometimes surname, taken from the French spelling of Pachomius, primarily in reference to Saint-Pacôme, Pachomius the Great.

First name:
Éric Pacôme N'Dri (1978) Ivorian 100 metres runner
Pacôme Assi, French kickboxer
Pacôme Rupin French member of parliament for La Republique en Marche party.

Surname:
Charles Pacôme (1902-1978) French wrestler

References

See also
Saint-Pacôme, Quebec in the Kamouraska Regional County Municipality

French masculine given names